Madauros (Madaurus, Madaura) was a Roman-Berber city and a former diocese of the Catholic Church in the old state of Numidia, in present-day Algeria.

History

The birth of the city dates back to the 5th century BC under the aegis of the Punics.

Madauros was made a Roman colony at the end of the first century and was famous for its "schola". A colony of veterans was established there; it was called Colonia Flavia Augusta Veteranorum Madaurensium under emperor Nerva.

The city was fully Romanised in the fourth century, with a population of Christian Berbers who spoke mainly African Romance, according to Theodor Mommsen.

Madauros was the see of a Christian diocese. There were three famous bishops of this diocese: Antigonus, who celebrated the 349 Council of Carthage; Placentius, who celebrated the 407 Council of Carthage and Conference of 411; and Pudentius, who was forced into exile alongside others present at the Synod of 484 because of the Vandal king Huneric.

The ruins of Madauros are close to the actual city of M'Daourouch in present-day Algeria. It is possible to see:
 A Roman mausoleum with some statues.
 A Roman theatre, reduced in size because of a Byzantine fortification made in 535.
 Some small Roman thermae.
 A Roman basilica of the Byzantine era with three sections of columns.
 Some epitaphs, with Latin inscriptions.

Notable residents 
Apuleius, the author of the famous novel The Golden Ass, which is the only Latin novel to survive in its entirety, was born in Madauros in the 120s. Lucius, the (fictional) protagonist of the novel, is also from Madauros.

Saint Augustine of Hippo studied in Madauros in the 4th century.

See also

 Caesarea, Numidia
 Cirta
 Lambaesis
 Milevum

Notes

Bibliography

 Gurney, Hudson The works of Apuleius Publisher Bell (University of California Libraries). London, 1878
 Gsell, Stephane. Histoire ancienne de l'Afrique du Nord en 8 tomes, Inscriptions de Madaure, ibid., p. CLXX-CLXXIV. Paris, 1922. 
 Mommsen, Theodore. The Provinces of the Roman Empire. Barnes & Noble Ed. New York, 2005

External links 

 Images of Madauros (M'daourouch) in Manar al-Athar digital image archive

Archaeological sites in Algeria
Roman towns and cities in Algeria
Ancient Berber cities
Former populated places in Algeria
Populated places established in the 1st century
Populated places disestablished in the 7th century
7th-century disestablishments in the Exarchate of Africa

es:Madaura